Tetrahydroquinoline is an organic compound that is the semi-hydrogenated derivative of quinoline.  It is a colorless oil.

Use
Substituted derivatives of tetrahydroquinoline are common in medicinal chemistry.  Oxamniquine, dynemycin, viratmycin, and nicainoprol are bioactive tetrahydroquinolines.  Typically tetrahydroquinoline derivatives are prepared by hydrogenation of the corresponding quinoline using heterogeneous catalysts.

Synthesis
Tetrahydroquinolines are produced by hydrogenation of quinolines. Because the hydrogenation is reversible, tetrahydroquinoline has been often examined as a hydrogen-donor solvent in coal liquifaction.

Using homogeneous catalysts, asymmetric hydrogenation has been demonstrated.  It can also be prepared from 1-indanone (benzocyclopentanone).

References

Amine solvents